Michael Frese is a psychologist who teaches management and organizational behaviour at Asia School of Business, Malaysia and Leuphana University of Lüneburg, Germany. He is a visiting professor at Makerere University Business School in Kampala, Uganda, and at National University of Singapore Business School. He was head of the department and Provost Chair at National University of Singapore Business School.

Education and career 
Frese completed his Master of Science at the Free University of Berlin. After studying psychology, Frese worked at the chair for educational and social sciences at the Technical University of Berlin. He received his doctorate in 1978.  In 1980, he was a visiting professor at the University of Bremen, and from 1981 until 1983 at the University of Pennsylvania.  In 1984, Frese received a professorship for work psychology at Ludwig Maximilian University of Munich. From 1991 to 2009 he held the chair for work and organizational psychology at Justus Liebig University Giessen.  In the period from 1995 to 2000, he also held a chair at the University of Amsterdam.  

Frese has held a dual appointment at Leuphana University of Lüneburg since 2009.  From 2009 until 2020, this was with the National University of Singapore Business School, where he served as department head, and was promoted to Provost Chair in 2016.  In 2020, he took a period of leave from the National University of Singapore, and took a position as professor of organization and management at the Asia School of Business.

Frese's research is in the areas of stress, work and health and human-computer interaction.  He introduced the concept of error management.

Awards and honors
In 2013, Frese was elected a fellow to the German National Academy of Sciences Leopoldina.

References

External links
  at Asia School of Business
 

1949 births
German psychologists
Living people